Special Operations Command Korea or SOCKOR, the United States (U.S.) Theater Special Operations Command (TSOC) in the Republic of Korea (ROK), is a Sub-Unified Command assigned under the Combatant Command (COCOM) of United States Special Operations Command (USSOCOM), who delegated Operational Command (OPCON) of SOCKOR to the U.S. Indo-Pacific Command (USINDOPACOM) Commander, who further delegated OPCON of SOCKOR to the United States Forces Korea (USFK) Commander.

SOCKOR focuses on readiness and the ability to fight in defense of the Korean peninsula and the U.S.-ROK Alliance.  This is accomplished through several means, ranging from individual and unit readiness and training to continuous updates and validation of operational plans, and participation in Joint Chiefs of Staff and other exercises.

Mission 

During armistice, crisis, and conflict, SOCKOR serves as the headquarters for command and control of all U.S. Special Operations Forces (SOF) assets in Korea, develops supporting plans, and works together with the Republic of Korea Special Warfare Command (ROK SWC) and United Nations (U.N.) SOF in support of the Commander, United Nations Command (UNC)/ Combined Forces Command (CFC)/ United States Forces Korea (USFK) in order to deter aggression and promote stability in the region. On order, SOCKOR combines with ROK SWC to form the Combined Unconventional Warfare Task Force (CUWTF) and the Commander, SOCKOR also becomes the United Nations Command Special Operations Component (UNCSOC) Commanding General to conduct special operations in support of the Commander, UNC/CFC/USFK efforts to defeat external threats and restore stability.

History 
Prior to 1988, management of Special Operations Forces in Korea fell to United States Forces Korea (USFK) Joint Operations (J3), Special Operations Division-Korea (SOD-K). The concept of a permanent TSOC in Korea began to take shape in 1983, growing on 1 October 1988 to the creation of a special operations element within the USFK J3. Colonel James Estep, the first Commander, also served as Chief, J3 SOD-K and Deputy Commander, Combined Operations (C-3,) SOD-K. This dual-hatted command continued until July 1995. Colonel Skip Booth separated this special operations element from USFK J3 SOD, establishing it as an independently functioning command. The name of this element changed to SOCKOR to begin to align with the other TSOCS, and the staff began transforming SOCKOR into a separate sub-unified command under the operational control of the Commander, United States Forces Korea (COMUSFK). In 2000, SOCKOR was recognized as a fully  operational TSOC and the billet for the commander of SOCKOR was elevated to Brigadier General, mirroring the other TSOCs. SOCKOR has been commanded by a General Officer since 2000.

Since inception, SOCKOR has been the only TSOC in which U.S. and host nation SOF are institutionally organized for combined operations. SOCKOR and ROK SWC regularly train in their combined roles, while SOCKOR’s Special Forces Detachment-39 works as the full-time liaison between ROK SF and U.S. SOF.

In armistice, the CG of SOCKOR is responsible for the planning, training, and execution of all U.S. SOF activities in Korea. The SOCKOR CG also serves as the senior advisor to COMUSFK regarding all U.S. SOF issues. If the armistice fails, SOCKOR and ROK SWC will combine to establish the Combined Unconventional Warfare Task Force under the Combined Forces Command. SOCKOR is then also designated as the United Nations Command Special Operations Component under the United Nations Command, with the SOCKOR Commanding General serving as the UNCSOC Commanding General.

Headquarters 

SOCKOR is located at Camp Humphreys in Pyeongtaek, South Korea.

List of commanders 

 12 Brig Gen Richard Haddad, October 2008 to October 2010
13: Neil H. Tolley, October 2010- October 2012
14: Eric P. Wendt, October 2012 to April 2014
15: BG E. John Deedrick, April 2014 to April 2016
16: Maj Gen Tony D. Bauernfeind, April 2016 to June 2019
17: BG Otto K. Liller, July 2019 to June 2021
18: MG Michael E. Martin, June 2021 to present

Unit decorations 
The unit awards depicted below are for Headquarters, Special Operations Command Korea. Award for unit decorations do not apply to any subordinate organizations, commands or any other activities unless the orders specifically address them.

See also 
 Ronald S. Mangum – former SOCKOR commander

References

External links 

 Official site
 Official photos
 SOCKOR at GlobalSecurity.org
  Shoulder Sleeve Insignia and Distinctive Unit Insignia

United States military in South Korea
+Korea